A ring system is a disc or ring, orbiting an astronomical object, that is composed of solid material such as dust and moonlets, and is a common component of satellite systems around giant planets. A ring system around a planet is also known as a planetary ring system.

The most prominent and most famous planetary rings in the Solar System are those around Saturn, but the other three giant planets (Jupiter, Uranus, and Neptune) also have ring systems. There are also dust rings around the sun at the distances of Mercury, Venus, and Earth, in mean motion resonance with these planets. Recent evidence suggests that ring systems may also be found around other types of astronomical objects, including minor planets, moons, brown dwarfs, and other stars.

Ring systems of planets 

There are three ways that thicker planetary rings have been proposed to have formed: from material of the protoplanetary disk that was within the Roche limit of the planet and thus could not coalesce to form moons, from the debris of a moon that was disrupted by a large impact, or from the debris of a moon that was disrupted by tidal stresses when it passed within the planet's Roche limit. Most rings were thought to be unstable and to dissipate over the course of tens or hundreds of millions of years, but it now appears that Saturn's rings might be quite old, dating to the early days of the Solar System.

Fainter planetary rings can form as a result of meteoroid impacts with moons orbiting around the planet or, in case of Saturn's E-ring, the ejecta of cryovolcanic material.

The composition of ring particles varies; they may be silicate or icy dust. Larger rocks and boulders may also be present, and in 2007 tidal effects from eight 'moonlets' only a few hundred meters across were detected within Saturn's rings. The maximum size of a ring particle is determined by the specific strength of the material it is made of, its density, and the tidal force at its altitude. The tidal force is proportional to the average density inside the radius of the ring, or to the mass of the planet divided by the radius of the ring cubed. It is also inversely proportional to the square of the orbital period of the ring.

Sometimes rings will have "shepherd" moons, small moons that orbit near the inner or outer edges of rings or within gaps in the rings. The gravity of shepherd moons serves to maintain a sharply defined edge to the ring; material that drifts closer to the shepherd moon's orbit is either deflected back into the body of the ring, ejected from the system, or accreted onto the moon itself.

It is also predicted that Phobos, a moon of Mars, will break up and form into a planetary ring in about 50 million years. Its low orbit, with an orbital period that is shorter than a Martian day, is decaying due to tidal deceleration.

Jupiter 

Jupiter's ring system was the third to be discovered, when it was first observed by the Voyager 1 probe in 1979, and was observed more thoroughly by the Galileo orbiter in the 1990s. Its four main parts are a faint thick torus known as the "halo"; a thin, relatively bright main ring; and two wide, faint "gossamer rings". The system consists mostly of dust.

Saturn

Saturn's rings are the most extensive ring system of any planet in the Solar System, and thus have been known to exist for quite some time. Galileo Galilei first observed them in 1610, but they were not accurately described as a disk around Saturn until Christiaan Huygens did so in 1655. The rings are not a series of tiny ringlets as many think, but are more of a disk with varying density. They consist mostly of water ice and trace amounts of rock, and the particles range in size from micrometers to meters.

Uranus

Uranus's ring system lies between the level of complexity of Saturn's vast system and the simpler systems around Jupiter and Neptune. They were discovered in 1977 by James L. Elliot, Edward W. Dunham, and Jessica Mink. In the time between then and 2005, observations by Voyager 2 and the Hubble Space Telescope led to a total of 13 distinct rings being identified, most of which are opaque and only a few kilometers wide. They are dark and likely consist of water ice and some radiation-processed organics. The relative lack of dust is due to aerodynamic drag from the extended exosphere-corona of Uranus.

Neptune

The system around Neptune consists of five principal rings that, at their densest, are comparable to the low-density regions of Saturn's rings. However, they are faint and dusty, much more similar in structure to those of Jupiter. The very dark material that makes up the rings is likely organics processed by radiation, like in the rings of Uranus. 20 to 70 percent of the rings are dust, a relatively high proportion. Hints of the rings were seen for decades prior to their conclusive discovery by Voyager 2 in 1989.

Rings systems of minor planets and moons
Reports in March 2008 suggested that Saturn's moon Rhea may have its own tenuous ring system, which would make it the only moon known to have a ring system. A later study published in 2010 revealed that imaging of Rhea by the Cassini spacecraft was inconsistent with the predicted properties of the rings, suggesting that some other mechanism is responsible for the magnetic effects that had led to the ring hypothesis.

It had been theorized by some astronomers that Pluto might have a ring system. However, this possibility has been ruled out by New Horizons, which would have detected any such ring system.

Chariklo
10199 Chariklo, a centaur, was the first minor planet discovered to have rings. It has two rings, perhaps due to a collision that caused a chain of debris to orbit it. The rings were discovered when astronomers observed Chariklo passing in front of the star UCAC4 248-108672 on June 3, 2013 from seven locations in South America. While watching, they saw two dips in the star's apparent brightness just before and after the occultation. Because this event was observed at multiple locations, the conclusion that the dip in brightness was in fact due to rings is unanimously the leading hypothesis. The observations revealed what is likely a -wide ring system that is about 1,000 times closer than the Moon is to Earth. In addition, astronomers suspect there could be a moon orbiting amidst the ring debris. If these rings are the leftovers of a collision as astronomers suspect, this would give fodder to the idea that moons (such as the Moon) form through collisions of smaller bits of material. Chariklo's rings have not been officially named, but the discoverers have nicknamed them Oiapoque and Chuí, after two rivers near the northern and southern ends of Brazil.

Chiron
A second centaur, 2060 Chiron, is also suspected to have a pair of rings. Based on stellar-occultation data that were initially interpreted as resulting from jets associated with Chiron's comet-like activity, the rings are proposed to be 324 (± 10) km in radius. Their changing appearance at different viewing angles can explain the long-term variation in Chiron's brightness over time.

Ring systems may form around centaurs when they are tidally disrupted in a close encounter (within 0.4 to 0.8 times the Roche limit) with a giant planet. (By definition, a centaur is a minor planet whose orbit crosses the orbit(s) of one or more giant planets.) For a differentiated body approaching a giant planet at an initial relative velocity of 3−6 km/s with an initial rotational period of 8 hours, a ring mass of 0.1%−10% of the centaur's mass is predicted. Ring formation from an undifferentiated body is less likely. The rings would be composed mostly or entirely of material from the parent body's icy mantle. After forming, the ring would spread laterally, leading to satellite formation from whatever portion of it spreads beyond the centaur's Roche Limit. Satellites could also form directly from the disrupted icy mantle. This formation mechanism predicts that roughly 10% of centaurs will have experienced potentially ring-forming encounters with giant planets.

Haumea
A ring around Haumea, a dwarf planet and resonant Kuiper belt member, was revealed by a stellar occultation observed on 21 January 2017. This makes it the first trans-Neptunian object found to have a ring system. The ring has a radius of about 2,287 km, a width of ≈70 km and an opacity of 0.5. The ring plane coincides with Haumea's equator and the orbit of its larger, outer moon Hi’iaka (which has a semimajor axis of ≈25,657 km). The ring is close to the 3:1 resonance with Haumea's rotation, which is located at a radius of 2,285 ± 8 km. It is well within Haumea's Roche limit, which would lie at a radius of about 4,400 km if Haumea were spherical (being nonspherical pushes the limit out farther).

Quaoar 
In 2023, it was discovered that the dwarf planet and Kuiper belt object Quaoar has a widely-separated ring. The ring is at a distance over seven times the radius of Quaoar, more than double the previously understood theoretical maximum within the Roche limit.

Rings around exoplanets 
Because all giant planets of the Solar System have rings, the existence of exoplanets with rings is plausible. Although particles of ice, the material that is predominant in the rings of Saturn, can only exist around planets beyond the frost line, within this line rings consisting of rocky material can be stable in the long term. Such ring systems can be detected for planets observed by the transit method by additional reduction of the light of the central star if their opacity is sufficient. As of 2020, one candidate extrasolar ring system has been found by this method, around HIP 41378 f.

Fomalhaut b was found to be large and unclearly defined when detected in 2008. This was hypothesized to either be due to a cloud of dust attracted from the dust disc of the star, or a possible ring system, though in 2020 Fomalhaut b itself was determined to very likely be an expanding debris cloud from a collision of asteroids rather than a planet. Similarly, Proxima Centauri c has been observed to be far brighter than expected for its low mass of 7 Earth masses, which may be attributed to a ring system of about 5 .

A sequence of occultations of the star 1SWASP J140747.93-394542.6 observed in 2007 over 56 days was interpreted as a transit of a ring system of a (not directly observed) substellar companion dubbed "J1407b". This ring system is attributed a radius of about 90 million km (about 200 times that of Saturn's rings). In press releases, the term "super Saturn" was used. However, the age of this stellar system is only about 16 million years, which suggests that this structure, if real, is more likely a circumplanetary disk rather than a stable ring system in an evolved planetary system. The ring was observed to have a 0.0267 AU-wide gap at a radial distance of 0.4 AU. Simulations suggest that this gap is more likely the result of an embedded moon than resonance effects of an external moon(s).

Visual comparison

See also
 Shepherd moon
 Circumplanetary disk
 Circumstellar disk
 Accretion disk
 Lists of astronomical objects

References

External links 

 USGS/IAU Ring and Ring Gap Nomenclature
 Everything a Curious Mind Should Know About Planetary Ring Systems with Dr Mark Showalter, Bridging the Gaps: A Portal for Curious Minds
 Physical Chemistry of Evolution of Planetary Systems
 Gladyshev G. P. Thermodynamics and Macrokinetics of Natural Hierarchical Processes, p. 217. Nauka, Moscow, 1988 (in Russian).

 
Celestial mechanics
Articles containing video clips